Romaric Bouda (born 14 June 1997) is a French judoka.

He is the bronze medallist of the 2021 Judo Grand Slam Antalya in the -60 kg category.

References

External links
 

1997 births
Living people
French male judoka
21st-century French people